Santa Teresa is a small town in Puntarenas Province, Costa Rica. Like other coastal villages on the Nicoya Peninsula such as neighboring Mal Pais, Santa Teresa started as a remote fishing village, relying on agriculture, cattle ranching and small-scale fishing. Today, tourism is the main source of income of most families, and the town hosts surf camps,  yoga retreats, and both luxury and budget accommodations.

Visitors come from elsewhere in Costa Rica, from other Latin American countries, from the USA and Canada, and from Europe and Israel.

Transportation 
Public transport connects the neighboring towns of Cobano, Montezuma and Mal Pais, and direct bus connections go as far as San José. Car and ATV rentals are also available. There are regular flights to San José from Tambor Airport, approximately 45minute drive away.

References

 Lonely Planet Costa Rica 
 B&B Map Costa Rica Road Map 

Populated places in Puntarenas Province